Mănești is a commune in Dâmbovița County, Muntenia, Romania, in the valley of the Dâmbovița River, at a distance of  northwest of Târgoviște.

Administration
It was formerly part of plasa Voinești and between 1952 and 1968 it was part of Ploiești region. In 1968, the current administration was set and since, it is part of Dâmbovița County.

It is composed of three villages: Drăgăești-Pământeni (colloquially "Drăgăești"), Drăgăești-Ungureni (colloquially "Ungureni") and Mănești. Mănești and Drăgăești are on the right bank of the Dâmbovița River, while Ungureni is on the left bank.

Name
The name of Mănești is derived from "Manea" (a Romanian first name), the name of Drăgăești from "Drag" (meaning "dear" in Romanian) and the name of Ungureni from "Ungurean" (people from the Hungarian lands, i.e. Transylvania), as Romanians from Transylvania, then ruled by Hungary, settled in this place.

Population

, it had a population of 4,669. 96.6% of inhabitants were of Romanian ethnicity; 3.4% were Roma (Gypsies), concentrated in the village of Drăgăești. In 1924, it had a population of 3,123.

Economy
Most people are farmers, among the crops are apples and pears, as well as maize and wheat. A part of the inhabitants commute to Târgoviște, which is the closest city. Also, there used to be some petroleum extraction in the region, but the resources ended. In Ungureni, there was also a petroleum storage depot, but it was disbanded in the 1990s.

Nearby localities
 Căprioru (North-West)
 Decindeni (South-West)
 Dragomirești (South)
 Gheboieni (North-East)
 Prisaca (South-East)
 Tătărani (North-West)

References

 Anuarul "Socec" al României-Mari, ediţia 1925

Communes in Dâmbovița County
Localities in Muntenia